Leonid Ivanovich Pasechnik (born 15 March 1970, Lugansk, Ukrainian Soviet Socialist Republic) is a pro-Russian Luhansk politician who has served as Head of the Lugansk People's Republic (LPR) since 2017. He holds the position in acting capacity ever since the Russian annexation of the LPR in 2022. Pasechnik had previously held office as the LPR's Minister of State Security from 2014 to 2018.

Prior to his political career, Pasechnik served in the Security Service of Ukraine until the 2014 pro-Russian unrest in Ukraine, which he supported.

Biography

Background and military career
Pasechnik's father worked in Soviet law enforcement, for the OBKhSS, for 26 years. In 1975 the Pasechnik family moved to Magadan in the Russian Far East where Pasechnik's father was associated with gold mine operations.

Pasechnik graduated the Donetsk Military-Political College and worked for the Security Service of Ukraine (SBU) in Luhansk Oblast as a chief of a detachment combating contraband operations and the chief of the Stakhanov district detachment. On 15 August 2006 he became famous for intercepting large quantities of contraband at Izvaryne border checkpoint ($1.94 mln and 7.24 mln Russian rubles), at the same time refusing a bribe out of principle.

In March 2007 SBU Lieutenant Colonel Pasechnik received from the Ukrainian President Viktor Yushchenko a medal For Military Service to Ukraine, "for showing integrity and professionalism in the line of duty".

Career in the Luhansk People's Republic

In 2014 he sided with pro-Russian militants, becoming on 9 October 2014 a minister of State Security for the self-proclaimed state Luhansk People's Republic (LPR).

On 21 November 2017, armed men in unmarked uniforms took up positions in the centre of Lugansk in what appeared to be a power struggle between the head of the republic Igor Plotnitsky and the supporters of LPR Interior Minister Igor Kornet, who was sacked the previous day. Three days later, a government statement declared that Plotnitsky had resigned "for health reasons (due to) multiple war wounds (and) the effects of blast injuries, (which) took their toll." It was also stated that Pasechnik had been named acting leader "until the next elections." Russian media reported that Plotnitsky had fled the unrecognised republic on 23 November 2017 to Russia. On 25 November the 38-member People's Council of the LPR unanimously approved the change in leadership.

Pasechnik's position on the Minsk Agreements has been unclear. Upon taking office, he quickly declared his adherence to the Minsk Agreements, saying that "the republic will be consistently executing the obligations taken under these agreements." On 30 March 2018 Pasechnik stated "Our (LPR) experience can help all regions of Ukraine eventually gain freedom and independence, and then we can together declare a new Ukraine in which representatives of different nationalities and cultures will freely live." While meeting people living in territory controlled by LPR in the summer of 2019, Pasechnik stated: "It does not mean, that we will return back into Ukraine. This is the only way to stop this madness, this war. You should understand that we, as a sovereign state will be a state within the state – that will be our special status".

On 6 December 2021, Pasechnik became a member of the Russian ruling party United Russia. United Russia chairman Dmitry Medvedev personally handed him his party ticket during the party's annual congress in Moscow.

2022 developments

In February 2022, Russia invaded Ukraine, citing Ukraine's failure to implement the Minsk Agreements by not granting regions of the Donbas the required special status. On 27 March 2022, Pasechnik said that the LPR may hold a referendum to join Russia in the near future. The authorities of the Luhansk People's Republic eventually scheduled a "referendum" on the republic's entry into Russia as a federal subject for 23–27 September.

On September 30 2022, together with Donetsk People's Republic Head Denis Pushilin and pro-Russian occupation administration Heads Volodymyr Saldo of the Kherson region and Yevgeny Balitsky of the Zaporozizhia region, attended in Moscow the ceremony in which President of Russia Vladimir Putin formally announced the annexation and incorporation of those regions into Russia.

References

External links

1970 births
Living people
People from Luhansk
United Russia politicians
Heads of the Luhansk People's Republic
People of the Luhansk People's Republic
Pro-Russian people of the 2014 pro-Russian unrest in Ukraine
Pro-Russian people of the war in Donbas
Ukrainian defectors
Security Service of Ukraine officers
Specially Designated Nationals and Blocked Persons List
Ukrainian collaborators with Russia
Individuals designated as terrorist by the government of Ukraine
Anti-Ukrainian sentiment in Ukraine
Russian Military leaders of the 2022 Russo-Ukrainian War